Jürgen Gerlach (born 23 December 1948 in Castrop-Rauxel) is a West German retired slalom canoeist who competed in the 1960s and the 1970s. He won two bronze medals in the K-1 team event at the ICF Canoe Slalom World Championships, earning them in 1969 and 1971.

Gerlach also finished 26th in the K-1 event at the 1972 Summer Olympics in Munich.

References
Sports-reference.com profile

1948 births
Canoeists at the 1972 Summer Olympics
German male canoeists
Living people
Olympic canoeists of West Germany
Medalists at the ICF Canoe Slalom World Championships
People from Castrop-Rauxel
Sportspeople from Münster (region)